Rey Zamin (also Romanized as Rey Zamīn) was a village in Asara Rural District, Asara District, Karaj County, Alborz Province, Iran. At the 2006 census, its population was 67, in 20 families.  It has since been incorporated into the city of Asara.

References 

Former populated places in Karaj County